Joe Pool Lake is a fresh water impoundment (reservoir) located in the southern part of the Dallas/Fort Worth Metroplex in North Texas. The lake encompasses parts of Tarrant, Dallas and Ellis counties.

Joe Pool Lake was named after Joe R. Pool, a Congressman-At-Large from the Oak Cliff area of Dallas who represented this area as well as the rest of the state of Texas from 1963 until his death in 1968. Pool was highly influential in the passage of legislation and funding of the lake. The project to build Joe Pool Lake initiated by a promise made in 1960 by Kennedy-Johnson Natural Resources Advisory Committee member Joe Pool and was carried out, after Pool's death in 1968, by a citizens committee called the Lakeview (Joe Pool) Planning Council. Pool's project was approved by Congress in 1965 and was known as Lakeview Reservoir until 1982 when president Ronald W. Reagan signed a bill to rename the lake to Joe Pool Lake. Actual construction began in 1977, bridge work was finished in 1981, with lake completion in December 1985. Impoundment of water began in January 1986 and the lake was filled by June 1989.

After 60 years, through the sheer determination of Joe Pool, his congressional friends and the many members of the Lakeview (Joe Pool) Planning Council, Pool's promise of flood control for the Mountain/Walnut Creek watershed was made good to the affected property owners.

"On May 24, 1986 with the lake approximately half full and still several years away from being open to the public, a ceremony was held to dedicate the new Joe Pool Lake. 1,500 people attended including U.S. Democratic Majority Leader Jim Wright, who among others, had helped keep the project alive through the years. There was food, music, cannons, and speeches. Joe Pool would have been proud to be there."

Parks and recreation 

Joe Pool Lake includes a number of parks, paved boat ramps and parking lots, public swimming areas, a public marina as well a second marina located inside Cedar Hill State Park. Other parks include Britton Park, Loyd Park, and Lynn Creek Park.

Lynn Creek Marina 
A full-service marina and restaurant are located on the northwest side of the lake, just off Lake Ridge Parkway near the Lynn Creek Park entrance. The Lynn Creek Marina has 258 wet slips, 40 dry storage slips. a ship store and service center. All facilities are available to the public on first-come, first-served, for fishing, pleasure, and sailboats; boat rentals; with an indoor-outdoor fishing area; and Patio Bar & Grill.

Water Resources 
Joe Pool lake is mostly fed by Mountain Creek and Walnut Creek and drains north into Mountain Creek leading into Mountain Creek Lake. Joe Pool Lake is one of the few lakes in Texas that actually drains to the north. Joe Pool lake impounds water in two arms formed by Mountain Creek and Walnut Creek.

Currently (2005) Joe Pool Lake serves as a reservoir for the City of Midlothian for their public water supply. Several other entities have water interests in Joe Pool Lake, but are not currently using the water resources. The City of Midlothian has a water intake structure in the southeast leg of the lake. The Trinity River Authority of Texas also has a water intake structure in Cedar Hill State Park, but it currently not in use.

Fishing

Fishing Regulations 
Most species are currently managed with statewide regulations. The exception is a 14 to  slot limit on largemouth bass. Daily bag for all species of black bass is 5 in combination, but only one largemouth bass  or greater may be retained each day.

Stocking history

All-ages records

Junior angler records

Fishing tips 
Marked brush piles offer habitat in the lower end of the reservoir which are often good for both bass and crappie. Crappie fishing is also good under the bridges on both arms of the lake. In the Walnut Creek arm, the old creek channel is a good place to look for bass.

Fishing quality 
 Largemouth bass: 3 of 5
 Catfish: 2 of 5
 Crappie: 3 of 5
 Sunfish: 2 of 5

Facilities 
The TRA maintains excellent day use and overnight public recreation facilities. The only free boat ramp on the lake is at Britton Park on the upper end of the Mountain Creek Arm, although it is $5 to park. Cedar Hill State Park on the east side of the lake has the second most campsites of any facility in the state park system. It also has lighted fishing piers, boat ramps and group shelters. Local anglers complain that state park gates do not open until 8 a.m. daily.

See also 

 Trinity River Authority

References

 Cedar Hill State Park and Joe Pool Marina
 Tangle Ridge Golf Club
 Army Corps of Engineers Joe Pool lake
 Areas of Outdoor Interest
 Lynn Creek Marina
 Handbook of Texas Online
 SMU Archaeological and Historical Investigations of Joe Pool lake
 Cabins at Loyd Park on Joe Pool lake
 Dallas Morning News Article ID 0ED3CDCE9CEF65D0 Publish Date: December 22, 1985
 City of Grand Prairie Lynn Creek Park on Lake Joe Pool Offers Free Entry to Grand Prairie Residents

External links
 Cedar Hill State Park and Joe Pool Marina
 
 Joe Pool lake dot Org Website
 Loyd Park
 Lynn Creek Park
 Information about all of the Lake's amenities
 Joe R. Pool

Reservoirs in Texas
Protected areas of Dallas County, Texas
Protected areas of Ellis County, Texas
Protected areas of Tarrant County, Texas
Bodies of water of Dallas County, Texas
Bodies of water of Ellis County, Texas
Bodies of water of Tarrant County, Texas
1989 establishments in Texas